Nans Ducuing (born 6 November 1991) is a French rugby union full-back and he currently plays for Bordeaux Bègles and the France national team.

International career
Ducuing was part of the French squad for the 2017 France rugby union tour of South Africa. He made his debut in the second test.

References

External links
France profile at FFR
L'Équipe profile
ESPN Profile
UBB profile

1991 births
Living people
French rugby union players
Rugby union fullbacks
USA Perpignan players
Union Bordeaux Bègles players
France international rugby union players
Sportspeople from Hautes-Pyrénées